Gary Williams (born 1945) is an American basketball player and coach.

Gary or Garry Williams may also refer to:

Arts and entertainment
Gary Anthony Williams (born 1959), American actor
Gary Williams (singer) (born 1970), English singer
Gary Williams (Ultravox) (fl. 1990s), British musician, member of Ultravox

Sports

American football
Gary W. C. Williams (born 1936), Canadian football player in the CFL
Gary Williams (American football) (born 1959), American NFL football player
Garry Williams (gridiron football) (born 1986), American football player in the NFL and CFL

Association football (soccer)
Gary Williams (footballer, born 1954), English footballer for Preston, Brighton and Crystal Palace
Gary Williams (footballer, born 1959), English footballer for Blackpool, Swindon and Tranmere
Gary Williams (footballer, born 1960), English footballer for Aston Villa
Gary Williams (footballer, born 1963), English footballer for Bristol City and Oldham

Other sports
Gary Hart (wrestler) (Gary Richard Williams, 1942–2008), American wrestler
Gary Williams (Australian footballer) (born 1950), Australian rules footballer
Garry Williams (cricketer) (born 1953), New Zealand cricketer
Garry Williams (Australian footballer) (born 1956), Australian rules footballer
Gary Williams (English cricketer) (born 1965), English cricketer
Gary Williams (wrestler) (born 1972), Canadian wrestler
Gary Williams (sportscaster), host of the Golf Channel's Morning Drive

Others
Gary Williams (activist), Aboriginal Australian activist involved with the Aboriginal Tent Embassy in the 1970s
Gary Williams (politician), American politician, member of the Pennsylvania House of Representatives
Garry Williams (theologian), English theologian and academic

See also
Gareth Williams (disambiguation)